This is the list of cathedrals in Antigua and Barbuda, sorted by denomination.

Anglican
St. John's Cathedral, St. John's (Church in the Province of the West Indies)

Roman Catholic 
Cathedrals of the Roman Catholic Church in Antigua and Barbuda:
Cathedral of the Holy Family, St. John's

See also
List of cathedrals
Religion in Antigua and Barbuda
Roman Catholicism in Antigua and Barbuda

References

External links

Antigua And Barbuda
Cathedrals
Cathedrals